Ukraine competed at the 2013 World Aquatics Championships in Barcelona, Spain between 19 July and 4 August 2013.

Medalists

Diving

Ukraine qualified 12 quota places for the following diving events.

Men

Women

High diving

Ukraine has qualified two athletes in high diving.

Open water swimming

Ukraine qualified three quota places for the following events in open water swimming.

Swimming

Ukrainian swimmers earned qualifying standards in the following events (up to a maximum of 2 swimmers in each event at the A-standard entry time, and 1 at the B-standard):

Men

Women

Synchronized swimming

Ukraine has qualified twelve synchronized swimmers.

References

External links
Ukrainian Swimming Federation 
Barcelona 2013 Official Site

Nations at the 2013 World Aquatics Championships
2013 in Ukrainian sport
Ukraine at the World Aquatics Championships